Radolfzell am Bodensee is a town in Germany at the western end of Lake Constance approximately 18 km northwest of Konstanz. It is the third largest town, after Constance and Singen, in the district of Konstanz, in Baden-Württemberg.

Radolfzell is a well-known health care town (Mettnau) and an important railway junction of the High Rhine Railway and the Hegau-Ablach Valley Railway (leading to the Stahringen–Friedrichshafen railway). In 1990 Radolfzell was named the Federal Environment Capital City of Germany.

History
This town developed out of a monastery founded in 826 AD as a "cell" under Bishop Radolf of Verona. The town belonged to the Abbey of Reichenau, then to the house of Habsburg for a long time, and for 40 years was a Free Imperial City. In the centre is the gothic Cathedral of our Dear Lady, dating from the 15th century and decorated in the baroque style in the 18th. One particularly beautiful feature is the Rosary altar by the Zürn brothers and the Master of the House's Altar (1750) which contains the relics of the local Radolfzell saints Theopont, Senesius and Zeno. The "Hausherrenfest" is celebrated in their honour every year on the third Sunday in July, and the next day a famous Water Procession is held, as it has been every year since 1797. The citizens of the nearby village of Moos make a pilgrimage to Radolfzell in picturesquely decorated boats to fulfil an ancient oath. Also, there is the Austrian mansion in the market square, built in stages from the 17th to the 19th century, the knightly hall dating from 1626, and various historical patrician houses.

Radolfzell was the birthplace of the cartographer Martin Waldseemüller's mother.

Mayors
(Lord Mayor since 1975)

Twin towns – sister cities

Radolfzell am Bodensee is twinned with:
 Istres, France (1974)
 Amriswil, Switzerland (1999)

Notable people
Marcus Teggingeri (1540–1600), Roman Catholic prelate 
Joseph Victor von Scheffel (1826–1886) poet and novelist, retired in Radolfzell.
Emil Joseph Diemer (1908–1990), chess player
Wolfgang Ruf (born 1941), musicologist and academic
Werner Bodendorff (born 1958), musicologist and writer
Josef Eichkorn (born 1956), football coach
Jörg Baberowski (born 1961), historian
Patrick Baur (born 1965), tennis player
Sabine Auer (born 1966), tennis player
Pit Beirer (born 1972), motocross rider
Markus Knackmuß (born 1974), footballer
Kristof Wilke (born 1985), belt rower
Anna-Lena Forster (born 1995), para-alpine skier

References

Towns in Baden-Württemberg
Populated places on Lake Constance
826 establishments
Konstanz (district)
Baden